The Star Awards for Rocket is an award presented annually at the Star Awards, a ceremony that was established in 1994.

The category was introduced in 2010, at the 16th Star Awards ceremony; Elvin Ng received the award for his performance in Together and it is given in honour of a Mediacorp artiste who have made most improvement in the performance of his/her respective field of profession for the past year. The nominees are determined by a team of judges employed by Mediacorp; winners are selected by a majority vote from the entire judging panel.

No nominees were announced for this category. However, in 2013, the nominees were revealed on Toggle Now minutes before the presentation of the award.

Since its inception, the award has been given to seven artistes. Julie Tan is the most recent winner in this category for her breakthrough performance in The Dream Makers II.

The award was not presented since 2017.

Recipients

 Each year is linked to the article about the Star Awards held that year.

Most nominations

References

External links 

Star Awards